Dysschema marginata is a moth of the family Erebidae. It was described by Félix Édouard Guérin-Méneville in 1844. It is found in Brazil.

References

Dysschema
Moths described in 1844